The rivalry between Persepolis and Sepahan is a footballing rivalry played between Iranian clubs Persepolis and Sepahan.

History

2006 Hazfi Cup Final

This rivalry started in 2006 when Sepahan and Persepolis contested the Hafzi Cup championship, Iranian football's second-most prestigious competition. After both teams battled to a 1–1 tie in the first leg in Tehran, the two sides returned to Esfahan's Nagshe Jahan Stadium for the pivotal second leg, when a champion would be crowned. The first half was uneventful. But in the second half, things would get explosive. Ebrahim Asadi gave the reds the lead at the 56-minute mark. With that, a Persepolis championship seemed to be a foregone conclusion. But just nine minutes later, Hamid Shafiee, who also scored the equalizer in the first leg, tied the game with a goal in the 64th minute. Neither team would do anything special in extra time, so the game went to penalty kicks.

In the fateful shootout, Sepahan got off to a bad start as Jalal Akbari missed his shot and Karim Bagheri gave Persepolis the lead. But Sheis Rezaei and Alireza Vahedi Nikbakht missed their shots, and Sepahan would go on to win 4–2 in the shootout.

2007 Hazfi Cup Semifinal

As expected, the two sides would meet again in next year's Hazfi Cup semifinal. This time the spoils would be decided in one game, and with Persepolis playing in front of 100,000 supporters in Azadi Stadium, they looked like a good bet for revenge. The reds got off to a good start by scoring midway through the second half on a penalty kick by Farzad Ashoubi. Persepolis would also have some chances to extend their lead. All was set for a Persepolis celebration when with just two minutes left, Sepahan earned a penalty of their own. Hadi Aghili converted with ease, silencing the crowd and sending the game into extra time.

In the extra sessions, nothing much happened from the home side and most Spectators hoped the game to go to penalty kicks again. But the Sepahan players never gave up and could not let the chance decide for the winner. Out of nowhere, Mahmoud Karimi, who had barely played all season for Sepahan, and was ignored by the government controlled media of Iran, emerged as an unlikely hero by scoring three goals in the span of just nine minutes to sink Persepolis 4–1. Sepahan would go on to win their second straight Hazfi Cup by beating Saba Battery 4–0 on aggregate, and Persepolis fans have found this harsh defeat heartbreaking and tough to forget.

2008 IPL Championship

Throughout the 2007–2008 Iran Pro League season, Persepolis, under new head coach Afshin Ghotbi, was dominating the league. However, their one obstacle was still Sepahan, as they would be the only contender to bother Persepolis. In the middle of the season, Persepolis and Sepahan met at Esfahan's Fouladshahr Stadium. Sepahan won that game 2–1, handing Persepolis their first loss of the season. However, Sepahan would lose five points (reduced to three on an appeal) due to fan violence. But Persepolis also lost six points due to inability to pay former players. All things considered, Sepahan had a two-point lead over Persepolis at the top going into the last week of the season.

As fate would have it, the two teams would meet on the last day of the season in front 100,000 raucous fans in Azadi Stadium. Sepahan needed only a point to be crowned champs, while nothing less than a victory would do for the red giants. Persepolis got off to a dream start with a goal in the 18th minute from the league's top goalscorer, Mohsen Khalili. Khalili would also go on to hit the post and Persepolis was also denied a penalty kick on a controversial non-call by referee Saeed Mozafarri. Those misses would prove to be costly as 18-year-old sensation Ehsan Hajisafi would tie the game on a breakaway in the 30th minute. At halftime it remained 1–1, and Sepahan was just 45 minutes away from breaking the reds' hearts once more.

Throughout the second half, it was all one-way traffic as Ghotbi's men put four strikers upfront against Sepahan's defense, which still stood strong for almost the entire second half and did not allow   Persepolis to get the imperative goal they needed. After 90 minutes plus five minutes of stoppage time, the score was still the same, and Sepahan was getting ready to celebrate. But this time, luck would shift Persepolis' way. A Khalili free kick bounced at the feet of Karim Bagheri. Bagheri's experience would take over from there, as he sent a high cross to Sepehr Heidari who headed the ball in the back of the net in the 96th minute, giving Persepolis the championship, sending the crowd into a frenzy. Heidari's goal earned him a spot in Persepolis lore and proved to be a historic and memorable moment in team history.

2009 Hazfi Cup Round of 16

The two teams would meet at the Azadi Stadium again, this time in the Round of 16 of the Hazfi Cup. This time, however, both teams had been through a very lackluster season as they both changed coaches twice during the regular season. Sepahan and Persepolis finished 4th and 5th respectively in the IPL, which meant a very underachieving season for both teams.

Persepolis would take an early lead on a 12th minute cracker by Maziar Zare. Since then, the game became more lively as both teams created numerous chances. Zare also missed a golden opportunity to double his goal tally and Persepolis' lead after missing a penalty kick. In second half stoppage time, Sepahan captain Moharram Navidkia also squandered a tailor-made opportunity by firing over the bar from just a few yards out. Persepolis would go on to the quarterfinals, where they went down 2–1 to Pas Hamedan.

The aftermath of this game was very ironic in the sense that Sepahan, despite crashing out of the Hazfi Cup, would still qualify for the AFC Champions League because neighbors Zob Ahan, who finished second (among the top three) in the IPL, won the Hazfi Cup, which gave 4th placed Sepahan qualification to the AFC Champions League. Persepolis, however, had nothing to show for their efforts after having a more expensive squad than last season, when they won the IPL.

2013 Hazfi Cup Final
The 2013 Hazfi Cup Final was the clubs' second meeting in the final where Sepahan won 4–2 over Persepolis in the penalties in 2006. The match was also the last match of Persepolis captain Mehdi Mahdavikia, a former Iran national football team and Hamburg SV midfielder. After failed to agree on a venue between Ahvaz, Mashhad and Tabriz, final venue was decided with draw which Azadi Stadium was announced as the venue for the 2013 final. The two teams finished 1-1 in regular time and 2-2 after extra-time. The game went to penalties and Sepahan defeated Persepolis 4-2 in the penalty shootout.

All results

Summary of results

Trophies

Goal scorers

 Players in Italic are still active in football playing.
 Players in bold are still active for Persepolis or Sepahan.

League = "Iranian League" ; Cup = "Hazfi Cup"

 Own goal against Persepolis
  Siavash Yazdani

 Own goals against Sepahan
   Mohammad Nosrati
  Michael Umaña
   Danial Esmaeilifar
|}

Hat-tricks 

A hat-trick is achieved when the same player scores three or more goals in one match. Listed in chronological order.

Most successful coaches
 Coaches in bold are still active for Persepolis or Sepahan.

Notable matches 
 
 Persepolis 2–1  Sepahan          May 17, 2008
Persepolis won Sepahan in front of over 110’000 fans and became 2007–08 IPL champion.
Mohsen Khalili scored a spectacular volley from 20 yards to give Persepolis the lead, But Ehsan Hajysafi equalised a few minutes later. With ninety  minutes over, the injury time was nearly finished but Khalili again shot a deflected free-kick, Finding Karim Bagheri in the box. Bagheri turned and crossed the ball for Sepehr Heidari, who scored the second goal with a header to win the match for his team.

See also
 Football in Iran
 Persepolis F.C.
 Sepahan F.C.
 Tehran Derby
 El Gilano
 Mashhad derby
 Isfahan Derby
 Esteghlal F.C.–Sepahan S.C. rivalry
 Persepolis F.C.–Tractor S.C. rivalry
 Major football rivalries

References

Football derbies in Iran
rivalry
Derby
Persepolis F.C. matches
Sepahan S.C. matches